This is a list of waves named after people (eponymous waves).

See also
 Eponym
 List of eponymous laws 
 Waves
 Scientific phenomena named after people

References

Waves
Fluid dynamics
Water waves
Waves in plasmas
Plasma physics
Mountain meteorology
Atmospheric dynamics